Beniaján is a village located in the Region of Murcia (Spain), beside the mountains that close the Valley of Segura. It has a population of around 11,000, and is not far from the region's capital, Murcia.

Beniaján is known for the abundant production of citrus fruits that its factories export around the world; this is the most important economic activity in this city.

The town was founded during Roman times. Since before the 18th century, the Virgen del Carmen has been the Patrona (patron saint) of Beniaján. A statue is carried in procession annually in celebration of her feast day.

Main sights 
San Juan Bautista's church and Patrona's Chapel (17th-20th centuries)
Villanueva's church, Virgin of Azahar
Mirador de San Antón (viewing point)
Puntarrón Chico, a rocky spur commanding the city, home to an Argaric archaeological site
Parque Regional de El Valle y Carrascoy (mountains and natural spaces with special protection)

Festivals 
These are the main festivities of the town:

San Antón, 17 January
Carnival
Easter
Virgin of Azahar, 1 May
Virgen del Carmen, Patrona (patron saint) of Beniaján, 16 July

See also
El Argar

Sources

External links 
 Beniaján - Portal Ayuntamiento de Murcia(in Spanish)
 Beniaján - Región de Murcia Digital (in Spanish)

Municipalities in the Region of Murcia